Scott Wendland (born April 11, 1965, in Spokane, Washington) is an American former pair skater. Early in his career, he competed with Ashley Stevenson and Shelley Propson. He later teamed up with Jenni Meno and they competed in the 1992 Winter Olympics. After that season, Meno left Wendland for another partner. Wendland is now an ice skating coach.

Competitive highlights

Single skating

Pair skating with Stevenson

Pair skating with Propson

Pair skating with Meno

References

American male pair skaters
Figure skaters at the 1992 Winter Olympics
Olympic figure skaters of the United States
1965 births
Living people